Matt's in the Market is a restaurant in Seattle's Pike Place Market, in the U.S. state of Washington.

The menu changes based on the season, and has included fish, fresh vegetables and organic meats, seafood paella made with clams, mussels, octopus and prawns, as well as deviled eggs. Nearby Radiator Whiskey has been described as a "sibling" bar.

Dan Bugge is the owner. Matt Fortner replaced Jason McClure as chef in 2018.

See also 

 List of seafood restaurants

References

External links
 
 

Pike Place Market
Seafood restaurants in Seattle
Central Waterfront, Seattle